Monosodium tartrate or sodium bitartrate is a sodium acid salt of tartaric acid.  As a food additive it is used as an acidity regulator and is known by the E number E335. As an analytical reagent, it can be used in a test for ammonium cation which gives a white precipitate.

See also
 Sodium tartrate, the disodium salt of tartaric acid

References 

Organic sodium salts
Tartrates